Dmitry Alekseyevich Romanov (born 17 March 1987) is a Russian sport shooter.

He participated at the 2018 ISSF World Shooting Championships, winning a medal.

References

External links

Living people
1987 births
Russian male sport shooters
Running target shooters